Brooke Williamson (born August 15, 1978, Los Angeles, California) is an American chef, television personality and restaurateur. She is a Top Chef television series alum and co-owns Playa Provisions and Company for Dinner with her chef husband Nick Roberts.

Restaurants 
In 2001 Williamson was hired by Chris and Chantal Schaefer as executive chef of Zax where she met her husband who was her sous chef. Two years later she opened a restaurant with Roberts – Amuse Café. The couple thereafter opened Hudson House (which she left in December 2020 due to the coronavirus pandemic) the Tripel, Playa Provisions, Tripli-Kit, and Da Kikokiko.

Television appearances 
Williamson has participated in Top Chef Duels, Knife Fight, and Guy's Grocery Games. On BBQ Brawl she was a judge and she was host and mentor for  MTV's House of Food. She worked with Eko and Walmart on Cook Together, which was the first 'real time' cooking show in which viewers can cook with the hosts while they cook.

Philanthropy 
Williamson regularly participates in philanthropic efforts, oftentimes with Roberts. Examples of this include: her place on the Leadership Council of No Kid Hungry and a supporter of the James Beard Foundation. During the coronavirus pandemic she was active in the charity Help Feed the Frontline LA and World Central Kitchen.

Awards 
Williamson and her husband were awarded the title of "Rising Star Chefs" from StarChefs in 2004.  She is the youngest female chef to cook at the James Beard House and at age 21 she was the youngest person to become a sous chef at Michael's. Brooke won Season 14 of Top Chef, Season 2 Episode 3 of Knife Fight, and three consecutive challenges in Last Chance Kitchen. She was also the winner of the inaugural Food Network Tournament of Champions in April 2020 and was the runner-up in 2021 and 2022.

References 

Living people
1978 births
Women chefs
Women restaurateurs
Women television personalities
People from Los Angeles
Chefs from California
Restaurateurs
Top Chef winners
Chefs from Los Angeles